Yan Kit Swimming Complex, located along Yan Kit Road, was the second public swimming pool in Singapore, opening in 1952 and closing in April 2001. The complex cost a total of $513,000 (as of 1952) and pool users had to pay fifteen cents per entry. The complex closed due to a daily attendance of only 120 users by 2001.

History
Originally constructed as a filter tank for the Water Department, it was closed down during the Japanese occupation and had its plant removed. It was then refitted and rebuilt in December 1949 as Yan Kit Swimming Complex. Built by the City Council for $513,000, it was officially opened by then Governor of Singapore, John Nicoll and City Council president, T.P.F. McNeice on 29 December 1952. It was named after a Canton-born dentist Mr Look Yan Kit who came to Singapore in 1877 and was involved in the founding of the Kwong Wai Shiu Free Hospital in 1910. The pools first supervisor was Lee Hong Ming, who was a founding member of the Singapore Life Guard Corps and had served as pool supervisor at the Mount Emily Swimming Complex.

In 1994, the National Trades Union Congress Club announced plans to lease the pool and redevelop it part of its new clubhouse at a cost of $6 million, but it never materialised.

In April 2001, Singapore Sports Council (SSC) decided to close the pool and return it to the state because attendance had dwindled to an average of 120 daily and it was becoming too expensive to maintain. The foundation of the pools had deteriorated, making spot repairs ineffective. SSC estimated that it would cost S$400,000 to maintain and operate the complex annually and S$4 million to upgrade the entire complex.

In a move to give new life to old sports facilities, the SSC announced in 2005 that the complex was opened for possible development by private developers. These plans, too, never materialised.

Eventually, in 2011, the site was levelled and grassed in preparation for handover to the Singapore Land Authority. The process will be complete by April 2012.

Design
The complex, which occupies a 14,859-sq-m plot of land was built on an old railway site off Cantonment Road and contains three pools, a single-storey clubhouse and three other buildings which house toilets and showers. The pools were lined up in a row with diving platforms at one end and a lifeguard watchtower cum slide between two of the pools.

Significance
When it first opened, pool users had to pay 15 cents per entry. According to a former pool supervisor, the complex was so popular that there was only standing room and a two-hour limit was imposed on swimmers. On Tuesdays, the pool was opened only to women and girls who were too shy to appear in their bathing suits in front of men.

Before Yan Kit Swimming Complex, Singapore only had one other public swimming facility at the Mount Emily Swimming Complex that was built in the 1930s, which has also since been demolished.

Notes

Further reading
Troubled waters: Yan Kit & River Valley Swimming Complexes. (2006, August–September). The Singapore architect, 142–149.
(Call no.: RSING 720.5 SA issue #234)

See also
Singapore Sports Council
Toa Payoh

Places in Singapore